The 2018–19 UNLV Runnin' Rebels basketball team represented the University of Nevada, Las Vegas during the 2018–19 NCAA Division I men's basketball season. The Runnin' Rebels were led by third-year head coach Marvin Menzies and played their home games at the Thomas & Mack Center in Paradise, Nevada as members of the Mountain West Conference. They finished the season 17–14, 11–7 in Mountain West play to finish in a tie for fourth place. They lost in the quarterfinals of the Mountain West tournament to San Diego State.

On March 15, head coach Marvin Menzies was fired. He finished at UNLV with a three-year record of 48–48.

On March 27, UNLV hired South Dakota State head coach T. J. Otzelberger as their next head coach.

Previous season
The Runnin' Rebels finished the 2017–18 season 20–13, 8–10 in Mountain West play to finish in a tie for seventh place. They defeated Air Force in the first round of the Mountain West tournament before losing in the quarterfinals to Nevada. Despite having 20 wins, they did not participate in a postseason tournament after declining an invite to the CBI Tournament.

Offseason

Departures

2018 recruiting class

2019 recruiting class

Roster

Schedule and results

|-
!colspan=9 style=| Exhibition

|-
!colspan=9 style=| Non-conference regular season

|-
!colspan=9 style=| Mountain West regular season

|-
!colspan=9 style=| Mountain West tournament

References

UNLV
UNLV Runnin' Rebels basketball seasons
Run
Run